Oshay Keyona Nelson-Lawes (born 27 June 1996) is a footballer who plays as a forward for ProStars FC in League1 Ontario. Born in Canada, she represents the Jamaica women's national team.

College career
In 2016, she attended Tyler Junior College scoring 20 goals in 24 games for the women's soccer team. She was named a 2016 NJCAA Division I Women's Soccer First Team All-American.

In 2019, she attended Ryerson University appearing in four games.

Club career
From 2015 to 2017, Lawes played with North Mississauga SC in League1 Ontario. In 2015, she was named a League First Team All-Star.

In 2018, she was one of the first two official signings for Blue Devils FC's women's team, with whom she played for two seasons.

In 2021, she played with Woodbridge Strikers.

In 2022, she played with ProStars FC.

International career
Nelson-Lawes represented Jamaica at the 2012 CONCACAF Women's U-17 Championship.

At the 2014 CONCACAF Women's U-20 Championship qualification tournament, she scored a hat trick against Bermuda July 23, as well as another one in the next match against Curacao. She scored another hat-trick in the second round of qualifying against St. Kitts and Nevis.

She was named to the Jamaica U20 for the 2014 CONCACAF Women's U-20 Championship. At the 2015 CONCACAF Women's U-20 Championship, she scored four goals in a 6-1 victory over Trinidad and Tobago, equalling a tournament scoring record for most goals in a single match.

She made her senior debut during the 2018 Central American and Caribbean Games.

Personal life
Nelson-Lawes' grandparents hail from Clarendon.

References

1996 births
Living people
Citizens of Jamaica through descent
Jamaican women's footballers
Women's association football forwards
Tyler Apaches women's soccer players
Jamaica women's international footballers
Jamaican expatriate women's footballers
Jamaican expatriate sportspeople in the United States
Expatriate women's soccer players in the United States
Blue Devils FC (women) players
Black Canadian women's soccer players
Canadian sportspeople of Jamaican descent
Canadian expatriate soccer players
Canadian expatriate sportspeople in the United States
Woodbridge Strikers (women) players
North Mississauga SC (women) players
League1 Ontario (women) players
ProStars FC players